Paju is a city in Gyeonggi Province, South Korea.

Paju may also refer to:

Places
Paju Station, subway station in Paju
Paju, Tartu County, village in Elva Parish, Tartu County, Estonia
Paju, Valga County, village in Valga Parish, Valga County, Estonia
Battle of Paju

People
Ants Paju (1944–2011), Estonian politician, journalist, athlete, and engineer
Imbi Paju (born 1959), Estonian journalist, writer and filmmaker

Arts, media, and entertainment
Paju, a 2009 South Korean film

See also
Pajo (disambiguation)

Estonian-language surnames